Natália Šubrtová (born 1 May 1989 in Kežmarok) is a retired Slovak alpine skier, sighted guide and eleven-time Paralympic Champion.

As the sighted guide for Henrieta Farkašová, she has won three gold at the 2010 Winter Paralympics, at Whistler Creekside in the Women's giant slalom, Women's Super combined, Women's Super-G, visually impaired and a silver medal in Women's downhill, visually impaired. In the 2011 International Paralympic Committee (IPC) Alpine Skiing World Championships in Sestriere, Italy, January 2011 taking gold in the Women's Visually Impaired event were the familiar pair from Slovakia, Henrieta Farkasova with her guide Natalia Subrtova. The two took an incredible four gold medals during the Championships: Women's giant slalom, women's super combined, Women's down hill and Women's slalom. They also won a bronze medal in the Team event.

References 

1989 births
Living people
People from Kežmarok
Sportspeople from the Prešov Region
Slovak female alpine skiers
Paralympic alpine skiers of Slovakia
Alpine skiers at the 2010 Winter Paralympics
Paralympic gold medalists for Slovakia
Paralympic silver medalists for Slovakia
Medalists at the 2014 Winter Paralympics
Medalists at the 2010 Winter Paralympics
Medalists at the 2018 Winter Paralympics
Paralympic medalists in alpine skiing